The Land Dayak languages are a group of dozen or so languages spoken by the Bidayuh Land Dayaks of Borneo.

Languages

Glottolog
Glottolog classifies the Land Dayak languages as follows.

Benyadu-Bekati: Bekati (Bekatiq), Sara, Lara (Rara), Benyadu
Bidayuh:
Bukar–Sadong (Serian)
Biatah–Tringgus, Jagoi (Bau and Jagoi Babang district of Bengkayang Regency)
Southern: Djongkang, Kembayan (both in Sanggau Regency), Semandang (mainly in northern part of Ketapang Regency), Ribun, Sanggau 

In 2020, Semandang was split into Beginci, Gerai, and Semandang for ISO 639-3 by SIL International.

Smith (2017)
Smith (2017) classifies the Land Dayak languages as follows.
Banyadu-Bekati (Banyadu, Bekati, Rara, Lara)
Bidayuh-Southern Land Dayak
Bidayuh (Bau-Jagoi, Bukar-Sadong, Sungkung, Hliboi, Biatah)
Southern Land Dayak (Golik, Jangkang, Ribun, Sanggau, Simpang)

West Kalimantan groups

List of Bidayuh-speaking Dayak ethnic subgroups and their respective languages in West Kalimantan province, Indonesia:

{| class="wikitable sortable"
! Group !! Subgroup !! Language !! Regency
|-
| Angan ||  || Mali || Landak
|-
| Badat ||  || Badat || Sanggau
|-
| Bakati' || Bakati' Kanayatn Satango || Bakati' || Bengkayang
|-
| Bakati' || Bakati' Kuma || Bakati' || Bengkayang?
|-
| Bakati' || Bakati' Lape || Bakati' || Bengkayang
|-
| Bakati' || Bakati' Lumar || Bakati' || Bengkayang
|-
| Bakati' || Bakati' Palayo || Bakati' || Bengkayang
|-
| Bakati' || Bakati' Payutn || Bakati' || Bengkayang
|-
| Bakati' || Bakati' Rara || Bakati' || Sambas, Bengkayang
|-
| Bakati' || Bakati' Riok || Bakati' || Bengkayang
|-
| Bakati' || Bakati' Sara || Bakati' || Bengkayang
|-
| Bakati' || Bakati' Sebiha' || Bakati' || Bengkayang
|-
| Bakati' || Bakati' Subah || Bakati' || Sambas, Bengkayang
|-
| Bakati' || Bakati' Tari' || Bakati' || Bengkayang
|-
| Balantiatn ||  || Balantiatn-Banyadu' || Sanggau, Landak
|-
| Banyadu' ||  || Banyadu' || Bengkayang, Landak
|-
| Bi Somu ||  || Bi Somu || Sanggau
|-
| Bubung ||  || Bubung (Badeneh) || Landak
|-
| Butok ||  || Butok || Bengkayang
|-
| Dosatn ||  || Dosatn || Sanggau
|-
| Entabang ||  || Entabang/Entebang || Sanggau
|-
| Golik ||  || Golik || Sanggau
|-
| Gun ||  || Gun || Sanggau
|-
| Hibun ||  || Hibun || Sanggau
|-
| Jagoi ||  || Jagoi (Bidoi') || Bengkayang
|-
| Jangkang || Jangkang Benua || Jangkang || Sanggau
|-
| Jangkang || Jangkang Engkarong || Jangkang || Sanggau
|-
| Jangkang || Jangkang Jungur Tanjung || Jangkang || Sanggau
|-
| Jangkang || Jangkang Kopa || Jangkang || Sanggau
|-
| Kanayatn || Padakng || Bakambai || Landak
|-
| Kancikng ||  || Kancikng (Bemedeh) || Ketapang, Sanggau
|-
| Keneles ||  || Keneles (Bekay) || Sanggau
|-
| Keramay ||  || Keramay || Sanggau
|-
| Kodatn ||  || Kodatn || Sanggau
|-
| Koman ||  || Koman || Sekadau
|-
| Kowotn ||  || Kowotn || Bengkayang
|-
| Laur ||  || Laur || Ketapang
|-
| Laya ||  || Laya || Sanggau
|-
| Liboy ||  || Liboy || Bengkayang
|-
| Mali ||  || Mali || Sanggau, Landak, Ketapang
|-
| Mentuka' ||  || Mentuka' || Sekadau
|-
| Muara ||  || Muara || Sanggau
|-
| Mudu' ||  || Mudu' || Sanggau
|-
| Pandu ||  || Panu || Sanggau
|-
| Pantu ||  || Pantu Bamak || Landak
|-
| Paus ||  || Paus || Sanggau
|-
| Pompakng ||  || Pompakng || Sanggau
|-
| Pruna' ||  || Mali || Sanggau
|-
| Pruwan ||  || Pruwan || Sanggau
|-
| Punti ||  || Punti || Sanggau
|-
| Rantawan ||  || Rantawan Baaje' || Landak
|-
| Sami ||  || Sami || Sanggau
|-
| Sapatoi ||  || Sapatoi || Landak
|-
| Sekajang ||  || Sekajang || Sanggau
|-
| Selibong ||  || Selibong (Bamak) || Landak
|-
| Senangkatn ||  || Senangkatn || Sanggau
|-
| Sengkunang ||  || Baaje' || Landak
|-
| Sikukng ||  || Sikukng || Bengkayang, Sanggau
|-
| Simpakng || Banyur || Banyur || Ketapang
|-
| Simpakng || Kualatn || Kualatn || Ketapang
|-
| Simpakng || Sajan || Sajan || Ketapang
|-
| Simpakng || Semanakng || Semanakng || Ketapang
|-
| Sontas ||  || Sontas || Sanggau
|-
| Suruh ||  || Suruh || Sanggau
|-
| Suti ||  || Suti Bamayo || Bengkayang
|-
| Taba ||  || Taba || Sanggau
|-
| Tadietn ||  || Tadietn || Bengkayang
|-
| Tameng ||  || Tameng || Bengkayang
|-
| Tawaeq ||  || Tawaeq || Bengkayang
|-
| Tengon ||  || Tengon || Landak
|}

Some possible Bidayuh-speaking Dayak ethnic subgroups and their respective languages in West Kalimantan province, Indonesia:

{| class="wikitable sortable"
! Group !! Subgroup !! Language !! Regency
|-
| Daro' ||  || Daro' || Sanggau
|-
| Mayau ||  || Mayau || Sanggau
|-
| Sisang ||  || Sisang || Sanggau
|-
| Sum ||  || Sum || Sanggau
|-
| Tinying ||  || Tinying || Sanggau
|-
| Joka' ||  || Randau Joka' || Ketapang
|}

References

Bibliography
Noeb, Jonas; Rensch, Calvin R.; Rensch, Carolyn M.; Ridu, Robert Sulis. 2012. The Bidayuh Language: Yesterday, Today and Tomorrow (Revised and Expanded). SIL Electronic Survey Report. SIL International.

External links
Digitized works on Land Dayak at the SOAS Library

 
Greater North Borneo languages